Zeno "Nonoy" Obong Zuñiga, popularly known as Nonoy Zuñiga, is a Filipino musician, television presenter and physician.

Career
Zuñiga's singing career spans more than 3 decades, as a folk singer from 1971 to 1975 and then as one of the lead singers of the Family Birth Control Band which performed in venues like Philippine Plaza, Holiday Inn and the Manila Hotel from 1975 to 1980. All his performances in the United States from 1983 to the present are well-acclaimed. He has also performed in various countries such as Australia, Japan, South Korea, China and New Zealand.

Besides his musical career, he hosted a public service TV program called Kapwa Ko Mahal Ko, and an informational program called MedTalk with Dr. Z on IBC 13. He also heads EcoWise and NOW, two companies that deal with the preservation and conservation of the environment through proper waste disposal and the manufacture and marketing of organic products.

Zuñiga was also one of the hosts of the ABS-CBN noontime variety game show Pilipinas Win Na Win.

Personal life
Zuñiga is an amputee, having lost his right leg in a bombing incident during the Martial Law era while he was preparing for a concert.

Discography

Studio albums
Ako Ay Ikaw Rin (1981)
Much More (1982)
Live For Love (1983)
Fragments Of Forever (1986)
Feelin' It All (1986)
Christmas With Nonoy (1987)
Nonoy Zuñiga (1989)
I Will Be There For You (1990)
Timeless Classics (1992)
Tinig Ng Langit (1994)
Pure and Golden Love Songs (1997)
The Duet Album (1998)
Impressions (2001, Viva Records)
The Love Album (2005, Viva Records)

Singles
"Never Ever Say Goodbye" - 1981
"Doon Lang"
"Kumusta Ka"
"Araw Gabi" (also covered by Regine Velasquez-Alcasid, Daryl Ong, Ice Seguerra & Noel Cabangon)
"Love Without Time"
"Live For Love"
"Fragmemts Of Forever"
"Init Sa Magdamag" (with Sharon Cuneta)
"Pero Atik Ra" (with Jolianne Salvado, 2018)

Filmography

Television

Film

Accolades
1981 Best Pop Male Vocal Performance by a New Male Artist Aliw Award
1981 Most Promising Entertainer Aliw Award
1982 Entertainer Of The Year Aliw Award
1982 Album Of The Year for the Album Ako Ay Ikaw Rin Aliw Award
1982 Golden Record Award for the Album Ako Ay Ikaw Rin Aliw Award   
1982 Platinum Record Award for the Album Ako Ay Ikaw Rin Aliw Award
1982 Record Of The Year for the Album Ako Ay Ikaw Rin Aliw Award
1982 Best Male Vocal Performer Guillermo Mendoza Foundation
1982 Mr. Popular Entertainer Of The Year Guillermo Mendoza Foundation
1983 Ranked Top 6 Major Awards Cecil Award
1991 Best Male Vocal Performer Awit Award
1998 Most Outstanding Recording Artist Katha Award
1999 Best Performance By A Duet Awit Award
1999 Best Traditional Song Saan Ka Man Naroroon Awit Award
1999 Best Pop Vocal Collaboration Katha Award
2022 Dangal Ng Musikang Pilipino Award Winner Awit Award

See also
Rey Valera
Rico J. Puno
Marco Sison
Hajji Alejandro

References

External links

Living people
21st-century Filipino male singers
Filipino television personalities
Filipino amputees
Amputee musicians
21st-century Filipino medical doctors
20th-century Filipino medical doctors
20th-century Filipino male singers
1954 births